The following is a list of notable individuals who were born in and/or have lived in Arlington County, Virginia.

Academia
Jerry Coyne, scientist

Arts and entertainment
Danny Ahn, musician
Dave Bautista, actor and professional wrestler
Warren Beatty, actor and director
Gordon Bess, cartoonist
Steve Buckhantz, sports announcer
Sandra Bullock, Academy Award-winning actress
 Alyson Cambridge (born 1980), operatic soprano and classical music, jazz, and American popular song singer
George Washington Parke Custis, orator and playwright; stepgrandson and informally adopted son of President George Washington
Roberta Flack, jazz, soul, R&B, folk music singer, songwriter, and musician
Greg Garcia, television writer, producer and director
Zac Hanson, musician
Jacob Hemphill, lead singer for SOJA
Julia Kwon, visual artist
Shirley MacLaine, actress
Jim Morrison
Natalie Wynn, YouTube personality

Astronauts
David McDowell Brown, died in Space Shuttle Columbia disaster
John Glenn

Business
Frank Lyon, lawyer, newspaper publisher and land developer
Jeremy Stoppelman, CEO and co-founder of Yelp

Civil rights
Esther Cooper Jackson, African-American civil rights activist and social worker
Joan Trumpauer Mulholland, activist known for helping plan the March on Washington for Jobs and Freedom and taking part in Freedom Rides

Crime
Aldrich Hazen Ames
Major Nidal Malik Hasan, sole suspect in the November 5, 2009, Fort Hood shooting; born in Arlington
 Mikhail Kutzik and Natalia Pereverzeva, accused spies

Journalism
Katie Couric, journalist and talk show host

Medicine
Patch Adams, doctor
Charles R. Drew, physician, most prominent African-American researcher in the field of blood transfusions in the 1940s; namesake of Drew School

Military
 Grace Hopper, pioneering computer scientist, and United States Navy rear admiral
 George Juskalian, decorated member of the United States Army; served for over three decades; fought for three wars, including World War II, Korean War and Vietnam War
 Robert E. Lee, Confederate general who lived at Arlington House
 George S. Patton, Jr., U.S. Army general who commanded Fort Myer
 Blake Wayne Van Leer, Commander and Captain in the U.S. Navy. Lead SeaBee program and lead the nuclear research and power unit at McMurdo Station during Operation Deep Freeze.

Politics and government
W. Sterling Cole, former U.S. Congressman
Al Gore, former Vice President
Betty Heitman, co-chairman of the Republican National Committee, 1983-1987; ran The Heitman Group consulting firm in Washington, D.C.; resided in Arlington
Mary Landrieu, former U.S. Senator raised in Louisiana
Ajit Pai, Chairman of the Federal Communications Commission
Ilhan Omar, U.S. Congresswoman

Sports
Nataly Arias, Colombian association footballer
Connor Barth, former kicker in the NFL
Tom Dolan, Olympic swimmer
John Hummer, W-L high school basketball star, retired NBA player, entrepreneur
M. J. Stewart, NFL player, cornerback for Cleveland Browns, attended Yorktown High School
Torri Huske, swimmer, USA National Team
Bruce Djite, American-Australian footy player
Ryan Hall, mixed martial arts, UFC featherweight

Other
David Chang, chef
Anne Carter Lee, daughter of Robert E. Lee
Mary Custis Lee, daughter of Robert E. Lee
Mildred Childe Lee, daughter of Robert E. Lee
Robert E. Lee Jr., son of Robert E. Lee
William Henry Fitzhugh Lee, son of Robert E. Lee

References

Arlington, Virginia
Arlington
Arlington County, Virginia